Johanny Cepeda-Freytiz (born August 31, 1973) is an American businesswoman and politician who is a Democratic member of the Pennsylvania House of Representatives for the 129th district.

Background 
Cepeda-Freytiz was born on August 31, 1973 in New York City to Ana and Luis Cepeda. She attended school in the Dominican Republic from ages 9 to 14, before graduating from Mother Cabrini High School. She studied French at the State University of New York at New Paltz, receiving a Bachelors of Arts. Later, she acquired a Master of Science in Education degree from Long Island University.
She moved to Reading, Pennsylvania in 2007 and opened "Mi Casa Su Casa Café" in downtown Reading, after previously living in Washington Heights, Manhattan.

Political career 
Prior to her election to the Pennsylvania General Assembly she served on the Reading City Council, and as its president from July 2022 until December 2022.

References

External links
https://johannycepeda-freytizforpa.com/ Official Campaign Website

1973 births
Living people
People from New York City
Democratic Party members of the Pennsylvania House of Representatives
Politicians from Reading, Pennsylvania
State University of New York at New Paltz alumni
Long Island University alumni